The 2021–22 season was the 99th season in the existence of Villarreal CF and the club's ninth consecutive season in the top flight of Spanish football. In addition to the domestic league, Villarreal participated in this season's editions of the Copa del Rey, the UEFA Champions League, and the UEFA Super Cup.

Players

Reserve team

Out on loan

Transfers

In

Out

Pre-season and friendlies

Competitions

Overall record

La Liga

League table

Results summary

Results by round

Matches
The league fixtures were announced on 30 June 2021.

Copa del Rey

UEFA Champions League

Group stage

The draw for the group stage was held on 26 August 2021.

Round of 16
The draw for the round of 16 was held on 13 December 2021.

Quarter-finals
The draw for the quarter-finals was held on 18 March 2022.

Semi-finals
The draw for the semi-finals was held on 18 March 2022, after the quarter-final draw.

UEFA Super Cup

Statistics

Squad statistics
Last updated 22 May 2022.

|-
! colspan=14 style=background:#dcdcdc; text-align:center|Goalkeepers

|-
! colspan=14 style=background:#dcdcdc; text-align:center|Defenders

|-
! colspan=14 style=background:#dcdcdc; text-align:center|Midfielders

|-
! colspan=14 style=background:#dcdcdc; text-align:center|Forwards

|-
! colspan=14 style=background:#dcdcdc; text-align:center| Players transferred out during the season

|}

Goalscorers

Notes

References

Villarreal CF seasons
Villarreal
2021–22 UEFA Champions League participants seasons